{{Speciesbox
| image = Stethophyma grossum m1.JPG
| image_caption = In Germany
| taxon = Stethophyma grossum
| authority = (Linnaeus, 1758) 
| synonyms = {{Collapsible list |
 Acridium grossum (Linnaeus, 1758)
 Acrydium rubripes De Geer, 1773
 Euryphymus rubripes (De Geer, 1773)
 Gryllus flavipes Gmelin, 1790
 Gryllus germanicus Stoll, C., 1813
 Gryllus grossum Linnaeus, 1758
 Mecostethus grossus (Linnaeus, 1758)
 Oedipoda grossa (Linnaeus, 1758)
 Stethophyma flavipes (Gmelin, 1788)
 Stethophyma germanicus (Stoll, C., 1813)
 Stethophyma rubripes (De Geer, 1773)
}}
}}

The large marsh grasshopper''' (Stethophyma grossum) is a species of grasshopper belonging to the family Acrididae.

Distribution and habitatS. grossum'' is found throughout Europe, with a few records from western Asia. In the British Isles it is restricted to the New Forest, Dorset, and Somerset Wells and Ireland. It is the largest species of grasshopper to be found in the British Isles.

The habitat is typically wet meadow and marsh throughout its range. In southern England, the species is most often found in "quaking" sphagnum moss bogs.

References

Caelifera
Orthoptera of Europe
Oedipodinae
Grasshoppers described in 1758
Taxa named by Carl Linnaeus